Indonesia has two kecamatan (districts) named Jatibarang:
 Jatibarang in Brebes Regency, Central Java
 Jatibarang in Indramayu Regency, West Java

Indonesia has five desa (administrative villages) named Jatibarang:
 Jatibarang in Mijen, Semarang, Central Java
 Jatibarang Kidul in Jatibarang, Brebes, Central Java
 Jatibarang Lor in Jatibarang, Brebes, Central Java
 Jatibarang Baru in Jatibarang, Indramayu, West Java
 Jatibarang in Jatibarang, Indramayu, West Java